Beryl May Dent  (10 May 19009 August 1977) was an English mathematical physicist, technical librarian, and a programmer of early analogue and digital computers to solve electrical engineering problems. She was born in Chippenham, Wiltshire, the eldest daughter of schoolteachers. The family left Chippenham in 1901, after her father became head teacher of the then recently established Warminster County School. In 1923, she graduated from the University of Bristol with First Class Honours in applied mathematics. She was awarded the Ashworth Hallett scholarship by the university and was accepted as a postgraduate student at Newnham College, University of Cambridge.

She returned to Bristol in 1925, after being appointed a researcher in the Physics Department at the University of Bristol, with her salary being paid by the Department of Scientific and Industrial Research. In 1927, John Lennard-Jones was appointed Professor of Theoretical physics, a chair being created for him, with Dent becoming his research assistant in theoretical physics. LennardJones pioneered the theory of interatomic and intermolecular forces at Bristol and she became one of his first collaborators. They published six papers together from 1926 to 1928, dealing with the forces between atoms and ions, that were to become the foundation of her master's thesis. Later work has shown that the results they obtained had direct application to atomic force microscopy by predicting that noncontact imaging is possible only at small tipsample separations.

In 1930, she joined Metropolitan-Vickers Electrical Company Ltd, Manchester, as a technical librarian for the scientific and technical staff of the research department. She became active in the Association of Special Libraries and Information Bureaux (ASLIB) and was honorary secretary to the founding committee for the Lancashire and Cheshire branch of the association. She served on various ASLIB committees and made conference presentations detailing different aspects of the company's library and information service. She continued to publish scientific papers, contributing numerical methods for solving differential equations by the use of the differential analyser that was built for the University of Manchester and Douglas Hartree. She was the first to develop a detailed reduced major axis method for the best fit of a series of data points.

Later in her career she became leader of the computation section at MetropolitanVickers, and then a supervisor in the research department for the section that was investigating semiconducting materials. She joined the Women's Engineering Society and published papers on the application of digital computers to electrical design. She retired in 1960, with Isabel Hardwich, later a fellow and president of the Women's Engineering Society, replacing her as section leader for the women in the research department. In 1962, she moved with her mother and sister to Sompting, West Sussex, and died there in 1977.

Early life

She was baptised at StPaul's, Chippenham, on 8 June 1900. They had married at St Mary's Church, Goosnargh, near Preston, Lancashire, on 27July 1898. Her mother was educated at the Harris Institute, Preston, passing examinations in science and art. She was a teacher at Attercliffe School, in northeast Sheffield, before moving to Goosnargh School, near her hometown of Preston, where her elder brother and sister, John William and Mary Ann Thornley, were the head teachers. In March 1894, she had applied for the headship at Fairfield School, Cockermouth, making the shortlist, but the board decided to appoint a local candidate.

On 18March 1889, Dent's father was appointed to a teaching assistant position at Portland Road School, in Halifax, West Yorkshire, after completing a teaching apprenticeship with the school board. In the same year, Florence Emily Dent, his elder sister, was appointed head teacher at West Vale girls' school, Stainland Road, Greetland, moving from the Higher Board School at Halifax. In August 1889, he obtained a first class pass in mathematics from the Halifax Mechanics' Institute. He enrolled on a degree course at University College, Aberystwyth, in the Education Day Training College. In January 1894, he was awarded a first by Aberystwyth, and a first in the external University of London examinations. His first teaching post was at Coopers' Company Grammar School, Bow, London, before moving to Chippenham, where he was a senior assistant teacher at the Chippenham County School.

In October 1901, Dent's father left Chippenham to become head teacher of the then recently established Warminster County School, that adjoined the Athenaeum Theatre in Warminster. The family moved to Boreham Road, Warminster, where houses were built in the early 19th century. In April 1907, they moved to 22Portway, Warminster, situated a short distance from the County School and the Athenaeum. He was elected chair of the Warminster Urban District Council from 1920 to 1922, and remained as head teacher of the County School until his retirement in August 1929.

Dent's father was also a regular cast member of the Warminster Operatic Society at the Athenaeum and other venues. Dent and her younger sister, Florence Mary, would often appear with him on stage in such operettas as Snow White and the seven dwarfs and the Princess JuJu (The Golden Amulet), a Japanese operetta in three acts by Clementine Ward. In Princess JuJu, she played La La, one of the three maidens attendant on the princess, and sang the first act solo, She must be demure. In act two of the same musical, she performed in the fan dance, Spirits of the Night. She also acted in a scene from Tennyson's Princess at the County School's prize giving day on 16December 1913.

Education

Warminster County School (1909–1917)

From 1909, Dent was educated at Warminster County School, where her father was head teacher. At school, she was close friends with her neighbour at Portway, Evelyn Mary Day, the eldest daughter of Henry George Day, a former butler to Colonel Charles Gathorne GathorneHardy, son of Gathorne Gathorne-Hardy, 1st Earl of Cranbrook. In August 1914, she passed the University of Oxford Junior Local Examination with First Class Honours, and on the strength of her examination result, she was awarded a scholarship by the school. In 1915, she passed the senior examination with second class honours and a distinction in French, and subsequently, her scholarship was renewed. She then joined the sixth form and won the school prize for French in December 1916. In March 1918, she applied for a scholarship in mathematics from Somerville College, one of the first two women's colleges in the University of Oxford. She was highly commended but was not awarded a scholarship nor an exhibition.

University of Bristol (1919–1923)

In 1918, Dent joined the Royal Aircraft Establishment (RAE) at Farnborough, Hampshire. The First World War opened new employment opportunities for women, and RAE was one of the first military establishments to recruit women into engineering, and mathematical and computational research. In the same period that Dent was at RAE, Lorna Swain, then mathematics tutor at Newnham College in the University of Cambridge, worked at the establishment on the problem of aircraft propeller vibration. The Treasury reduced RAE's funding after the end of the war, and consequently, the number of resources and staff available to support research fell significantly. In 1919, she left RAE after being accepted on to the general Bachelor of Arts (BA) degree course at the University of Bristol. In June 1920, she passed her intermediate examination in French with supplementary courses in Latin, history, and mathematics.

In the following academic year, Dent joined the honours course in mathematics and took an intermediate examination in physics. After spending the summer of 1921 at her parents' home in Warminster, she returned for the start of the 1921 to 1922 academic year to find that Paul Dirac had joined the mathematics course. The course of mathematics at Bristol University normally lasted three years, but because of Dirac's previous training, the Department of Mathematics had allowed him to join in the second year. They were taught applied mathematics by Henry Ronald Hassé, the then head of the Mathematics Department, and pure mathematics by Peter Fraser. Both of them had come from Cambridge; Fraser had been appointed in 1906 to the staff of the Bristol University College, soon to become the University of Bristol, and Hassé joined him in 1919 as professor of mathematics. Fraser introduced them to mathematical rigour, projective geometry, and rigorous proofs in differential and integral calculus. Dirac would later say that Peter Fraser was "the best teacher he had ever had."

Dent studied four courses in pure mathematics:

There was a choice of specialisation in the final year; applied or pure mathematics. As the only official, registered feepaying student, Dent had the right to choose, and she settled on applied mathematics for the final year. The department could offer only one set of lectures so Dirac also had to follow the same course. Dent studied four courses in applied mathematics:

Newnham College, University of Cambridge (1923–1924)
In June 1923, Dent graduated with Dirac, gaining a Bachelor of Science (BSc) degree in applied mathematics with First Class Honours. On 7July 1923, she was awarded the Ashworth Hallett scholarship by the University of Bristol and was accepted as a postgraduate student at Newnham College in the University of Cambridge. On her death in 1922, Lilias Sophia Ashworth Hallett left one thousand pounds each to the University of Bristol and Girton College, University of Cambridge, to found scholarships for women. The University of Bristol scholarship was open to women graduates of a recognised college or university, and worth £45 at the time. She spent a year at Cambridge, leaving in 1924 without further academic qualification. Before 1948, the University of Cambridge denied women graduates a degree, although in the same year as she left Cambridge, Katharine Margaret Wilson was the first woman to be awarded a PhD by the university.

Career

High School for Girls, Barnsley (1924–1925)

Dent spent the summer of 1924 at her parents' home in Warminster, playing mixed doubles tennis in a tournament organised by the local Women's Unionist Association. In September of the same year, she was appointed an assistant teacher in mathematics at the High School for Girls, in Barnsley, Huddersfield Road, on an annual salary of £250. Annie Rose Nuttall, the school's head teacher, was a former student at Newnham College. In the early 1920s, women who had studied university level mathematics faced limited employment prospects, as mathematics and engineering professions, other than perhaps school teaching, were dominated by men. Dent resigned her position on 31August 1925 after being appointed a demonstrator (research assistant) in the Department of Physics at the University of Bristol, with her salary being paid by the Department of Scientific and Industrial Research, the forerunner of the Science and Engineering Research Council (SERC).

Department of Physics, University of Bristol (1925–1929)

In 1924, the University of Bristol Council had set aside a portion of a bequest from Henry Herbert Wills for the Department of Physics where Arthur Mannering Tyndall was building up a staff for teaching and research in the H. H. Wills Physics Laboratory, Royal Fort House Gardens. From August 1925, John Lennard-Jones, of Trinity College, University of Cambridge, was elected reader in mathematical physics. In March 1927, LennardJones was appointed Professor of Theoretical physics, a chair being created for him, with Dent becoming his research assistant in theoretical physics. LennardJones pioneered the theory of interatomic and intermolecular forces at Bristol and Dent became one of his first collaborators.

LennardJones and Dent published six papers together from 1926 to 1928, dealing with the forces between atoms and ions, with the objective of calculating theoretically the properties of carbonate and nitrate crystals. Dent's thesis for her master's degree,  (1927), was the basis of the three papers that followed in 1927; with LennardJones, "", and with LennardJones and Sydney Chapman, "" and "". On 28June 1927, she was awarded a MSc degree for her thesis and research work. In 1927, the physics laboratory at Bristol had a surplus of funds, and so it was decided that the funds would be used to provide more technical help. Consequently, Dent was asked to combine her research duties with the post of parttime departmental librarian, the first appointment of librarian in the Department of Physics.

In 1928, LennardJones and Dent published two papers, "", and with Sydney Chapman, "", that studied the force fields on a thin crystal cleavage. Around this time, quantum mechanics was developed to become the standard formulation for atomic physics. LennardJones left Bristol in 1929 to study the subject for a year as a Rockefeller Fellow at the University of Göttingen. She wrote one last paper before leaving the physics department at Bristol: "" (1929) examined the effect of the polarisation of surface ions in decreasing the surface energy of alkali halides. In November 1929, she was appointed to the position of technical librarian for the scientific and technical staff in the research department at Metropolitan-Vickers, Trafford Park, Manchester.

In December 1929, Dent resigned her position at Bristol and it was accepted with regret by the university council. Marjorie Josephine Littleton, the daughter of a local Bristol councillor and a graduate of Girton College, University of Cambridge, was appointed as her replacement on the 1February 1930. Littleton was later Sir Neville Mott's coauthor and research assistant in the physics department. In 1930, LennardJones returned to Bristol, as Dean of the Faculty of Science, and introduced the new quantum theories to the Bristol group.

Metropolitan-Vickers, Trafford Park (1930–1960)
MetropolitanVickers was a British heavy industrial firm, wellknown for industrial electrical equipment and generators, street lighting, electronics, steam turbines, and diesel locomotives. They built the Metrovick 950, the first commercial transistorised computer. In 1917, a Research and Education Department was established at the Trafford Park site, when the care of the library came within the remit of James George Pearce. He made the library the centre of a new "technical intelligence" section. In the 1920s, the post of librarian was held by Lucy Stubbs, a former assistant librarian at the University of Birmingham, and past member of the first standing committee of ASLIB. Stubbs did not possess scientific qualifications, maintaining that a librarian, if assisted by other technical staff, did not need to understand science or engineering. In 1929, James Steele Park Paton reorganised and expanded the section with Dent succeeding Stubbs as technical librarian on 6January 1930. She joined the scientific and technical staff as was one of only two senior women in the research department, and in contrast to Stubbs, was employed principally for her technical skills.

Dent was honorary secretary to the founding committee for the ASLIB Lancashire and Cheshire branch from 1931 to 1936. In 1932, the branch had twentysix members and had organised four meetings, including one addressed by Sir Henry Tizard, the then President of ASLIB. After the war, it formed the basis for the Northern Branch of the association. Technical librarianship emerged as a new scientific career in interwar Britain and rapidly became one of the few types of professional industrial employment that was routinely open to both women and men. By 1933, Dent reported that the MetropolitanVickers library had three thousand engineering volumes and around the same number in pamphlets and patent specifications. Besides covering electrical subjects, the library covered accountancy, employment questions, and subjects of interest to the sales department. It also issued a weekly bulletin, scrutinised patents, handled patents taken out by research staff, and exchanged information with associated companies.

Dent continued to publish papers in applied mathematics and contribute to papers on emerging computational technologies. In "" (1935), she developed a detailed reduced major axis method for line fitting that built on the work of Robert Adcock and Charles Kummell. In 1937, David Myers, then at the Engineering Laboratory at the University of Oxford, asked Douglas Hartree and Arthur Porter to calculate the space charge limitation of secondary current in a triode. The calculations relied on some initial numerical integrations that were carried out by Dent on a differential analyser. The results corresponded closely to those obtained experimentally by Myers at Oxford. Her knowledge of higher mathematics meant that she was asked to check the mathematics in papers for publication by engineers at MetropolitanVickers. For example, Cyril Frederick Gradwell, a graduate of Trinity College, Cambridge, asked her to scrutinise the algebraic part of his work in "" (1950). She would later analyse the problem of stress distribution in a thick disk based on a method devised by Philip Pollock, for Richard William Bailey , the former director of the mechanical, metallurgical, and chemical sections of the research department at MetropolitanVickers.

Dent was a delegate at the fourteenth International Conference on Documentation and was invited to the Government's conference dinner on 22September 1938 at the Great Dining Hall of Christ Church, Oxford. In 1939, she was elected to the editing committee of the ASLIB book list. In 1944, she was put in charge of the women working in the research department laboratory at MetropolitanVickers, and in 1946, she was promoted to section leader of the new computation section. Her role would bring her into contact with Audrey Stuckes, a materials science researcher in the department, and a graduate of Newnham College, who would later head the physics department at the University of Salford. In 1953, they collaborated on an investigation into the heating effects that occur when a current is passed through a semiconductor that has no barrier layer. Dent suggested methods to solve the equations and computed the numerical integrations. In the following year, she developed the Fourier analysis in "" (1954), that calculated the optimal radial oscillations to maintain cyclotron resonance in a synchrocyclotron. The causes of axial spreading of the charged particle beam during extraction were also analysed.

Dent joined the Women's Engineering Society and published papers on the application of digital computers to electrical design. With Brian Birtwistle, she wrote programs for the Ferranti Mark 1 (Mark 1) computer at the University of Manchester, that demonstrated that high speed digital computers could provide considerable assistance to the electrical design engineer. Birtwistle would later have an extensive career in the computer industry, working at, amongst others, Honeywell Information Systems and ADP Network Services. In 1958, she carried out computer calculations for the mechanical engineering team at the Nuclear Power Group, Radbroke Hall. Their paper outlined a procedure for calculating the theoretical deflection (bending) of a circular grid of support girders for a graphite neutron moderator in a gas-cooled reactor. A general expression was derived from the central deflection of the grid and the maximum bending moment on the central crossbeam for a range of grid diameters.

In 1959, and a year from retirement, Dent modelled a proposed Zeta circuit on the Mark 1 computer, for Eric Hartill's paper on constructing a highpower pulse transformer and circuit. The cost of the computation was about two thousand pounds, corresponding to around eighty hours of machine time. She retired from MetropolitanVickers in May 1960, with Isabel Hardwich, later a fellow and president of the Women's Engineering Society, replacing her as section leader for the women in the research department.

Personal life

In the 1920s, Dent was living at Clifton Hill House, the university hall of residence for women in Clifton. May Christophera Staveley was her warden and tutor at Clifton Hill House, and Dent returned to Bristol on 22December 1934 for Staveley's funeral. Dent was a member of the Clifton Hill House Old Students Association, and secretary and treasurer of the group of former Clifton Hill House students. She would later write "I was very sorry indeed to leave Bristol and have many happy memories of my time there. I shall miss living at the [Clifton Hill House] Hall very much."

In 1926, Dent was elected treasurer of the University of Bristol's Convocation, the university's alumni association. In 1927, she was one of eleven people elected to the standing committee of the Convocation She later represented the Manchester branch of the association. Around 1926, Dent was appointed honorary secretary of the Bristol Cheeloo Association. The association's aim was to raise sufficient funds to support a chair of chemistry at Cheeloo University. In an effort to publicise the cause and raise money, she presented to the local branch of the Women's International League in October 1928.

In July 1929, in Dent's last year at Bristol, she went on holiday to North Devon with friends that included Gertrude Roxbee, known as "Rox", who had graduated with Dent in 1923 with a BSc in botany. After moving to Manchester in January 1930, Dent found shared lodgings at 10Montrose Avenue, West Didsbury, in the same house as Roxbee who, at that time, was a teacher at Whalley Range High School. At weekends, she would ramble to Hebden Bridge, and with Roxbee, learnt to figure skate at the Ice Palace, a former ice rink on Derby Street in Cheetham Hill.

In September 1930, she returned to Bristol for the ninetyeighth conference of the British Association for the Advancement of Science (British Association), meeting her friends at an alumnae association lunch. In the afternoon of the 4September 1930, she toured Avonmouth Docks as a conference member, and in the evening, was invited to a reception held by Walter Bryant, the then lord mayor of Bristol, at the Bristol Museum & Art Gallery.. On the following day, she visited an aircraft manufacturer at Whitchurch Airport and attended a garden party at Wills Hall.

On the Monday of the conference, Dent was in the audience to see Paul Dirac present his paper on the proton and the structure of matter. She would later comment:

She had close links to StMatthew's; from 1956 to 1962, she served as a school manager for StMatthew's Church of England Primary School at Poplar Road, Stretford. She never married, believing that getting married, and the subsequent pressures of family responsibilities, would be a "wastage" of a woman's training. However, she also believed that women leaving employment to get married would mean promotion opportunities for other women, and that married women would still be able to return to work in midlife.

Later life and death

In 1962, Dent and her mother moved from Stretford to 1Cokeham Road, Sompting, a village in the coastal Adur District of West Sussex, between Lancing and Worthing. After a brief period as a teacher at a prep school in Malmesbury, Wiltshire, Florence worked as a secretary for a marine insurance firm attached to Lloyd's of London at 12 Leadenhall Street, commuting into London from Harrow each day.

Beryl May Dent died at Worthing Hospital on  after a long period of disablement. The funeral service was held on 12August 1977 at St Mary's Church, Sompting, followed by cremation. Her ashes were interred at Worthing Crematorium, in the Gardens of Rest, towards the Spring Glades, and her entry in the book of remembrance at the crematorium states:

There is also a memorial to her at the Church of StMary the Blessed Virgin, Sompting. The bishop's chair, situated close to the altar, bears a brass plaque with the following inscription:

Her Christian faith is perhaps not unexpected, given her father's work for the church in Warminster, and the era she grew up in, where religion pervaded social and political life.  However, it is notable that she remained a committed Christian while pursuing a scientific career.

Legacy
An archive of Dent's papers, that relate to her life and work in the 1920s in the physics department at the University of Bristol, is held in the Special Collections of the University of Bristol Arts and Social Sciences Library, in Tyndall Avenue, Bristol. Included in that archive is a series of s, written in the 1930s by members of the Clifton Hill House Old Students' Association, that include news and photographs of Dent, her family, and friends.

Atomic force microscopy

In 1928, LennardJones and Dent published two papers, "" and "", that for the first time, outlined a calculation of the potential of the electric field in a vacuum, produced by a thin sodium chloride crystal surface. They gave an expression for the electric potential produced by a system of point charges in vacuum (although not a real cubic sodium chloride ionic lattice). The expression for the potential in vacuum, at the point r = {x, y, z}, near the cubic lattice of point ions with different signs, the charge , and the period a (a crystalline solid is distinguished by the fact that the atoms making up the crystal are arranged in a periodic fashion), can be represented in the form:

 is the lateral vector that fixes the observation point coordinates in the sample plane.
 is the reciprocal lattice vector.
s is the number of planes to be calculated inside the crystal; s set to zero would calculate the surface plane.

The expression sums the set of potential static charges for the surface and lower planes of the crystal lattice. LennardJones and Dent showed that this expression forms a rapidly convergent Fourier series. Harold Eugene Buckley, a crystallographic researcher at the University of Manchester until his death in 1959, had suggested that their results should be treated with caution. For example, the contraction a crystal plane would suffer under the conditions prescribed would not be the same as that of a similar plane with a solid mass of crystal behind it. Another difficulty arises because calculation of crystal surface field force fields are so great that simplifying assumptions have to be made to render them capable of a solution.

Michael Jaycock and Geoffrey Parfitt, then respectively senior lecturer in surface and colloid chemistry at Loughborough University of Technology and professor of chemical engineering at Carnegie Mellon University, concurred with Buckley, noting that "an ideal crystal, in which the ionic positions at the surface were identical to those achieved in the bulk crystal... is obviously extremely improbable." However, they acknowledged that the LennardJones and Dent model was singularly elegant, and like most researchers working before the advent of modern computers, they were limited in what could be attempted computationally. Nonetheless, LennardJones and Dent demonstrated that the force exerted on a single ion, by a surface with evenly distributed positive and negative ions, decreases very rapidly with increasing distance. Later work by Jason Cleveland, Manfred Radmacher, and Paul Hansma, has shown that this result has direct application to atomic force microscopy by predicting that noncontact imaging is possible only at small tipsample separations.

Reduced major axis regression

The theoretical underpinnings of standard least squares regression analysis are based on the assumption that the independent variable (often labelled as x) is measured without error as a design variable. The dependent variable (labeled y) is modeled as having uncertainty or error. Both independent and dependent measurements may have multiple sources of error. Therefore, the underlying least squares regression assumptions can be violated. Reduced major axis (RMA) regression is specifically formulated to handle errors in both the x and y variables. RMA minimizes both vertical and horizontal distances of the data points from the predicted line (by summing areas) rather than the least squares sum of squared vertical (yaxis) distances.

In Dent's 1935 paper on linear regression, entitled "", she admitted that when the variances in the x and y variables are unknown, "we cannot hope to find the true positions of the observed points, but only their most probable positions." However, by treating the probability of the errors in terms of Gaussian error functions, she contended that this expression may be regarded as "a function of the unknown quantities", or the likelihood function of the data distribution. Furthermore, she argued that maximising this function to obtain the maximum likelihood estimation, subject to the condition that the points are collinear, will give the parameters for the line of best fit. She then deduced formulae for the errors in estimating the centroid and the line inclination when the data consists of a single (unrepeated) observation.

Maurice Kendall and Alan Stuart showed that the maximum likelihood estimator of a likelihood function, depending on a parameter , satisfies the following quadratic equation:

Using the quadratic formula to solve for the positive root (or zero) of :

Inspection of  shows that as  tends to plus infinity, the positive root tends to:

Correspondingly, as  tends to zero, the root tends to:

Dent had solved the maximum likelihood estimator in the case where the covariance matrix is not known.

Dennis Lindley repeated Dent's analysis and stated that Dent's geometric mean estimator is not a consistent estimator for the likelihood function, and that the gradient of the estimate will have a bias, and this remains true even if the number of observations tends to infinity. Subsequently, Theodore Anderson pointed out that the likelihood function has no maximum in this case, and therefore, there is no maximum likelihood estimator. Kenneth Alva Norton, a former consulting engineer with the then National Bureau of Standards, responded to Lindley, stating Lindley's own methods and assumptions lead to a biased prediction.

Richard J. Smith has stated that Dent was the first to develop a RMA regression method for line fitting that built on the work of Robert Adcock in "" (1878) and Charles Kummell in "" (1879). It is now believed that she was the first to propose what is often called the geometric mean functional relationship estimator of slope, and that her essential arguments can be generalised to any number of variables. Moreover, although her solution has its theoretical limitations, it is of practical importance, as it likely represents the best a priori estimate if nothing is known about the true error distribution in the model. It is generally much less reasonable to assume that all the error, or residual scatter, is attributable to one of the variables.

Electrical design using digital computers 

In the 1950s, British electrical engineers would rarely use a digital computer, and if they did, it would be to solve some complicated equation outside the scope of analogue computers. To a certain extent, engineers were deterred by the difficulty and the time taken to program a particular problem. Furthermore, the varied and often unique problems that arise in electrical design practice, together with the degree of uncertainty of the numerical data of many problems, accentuated this tendency. On 10 April 1956, Dent and Brian Birtwistle presented their paper, "", to the Convention on Digital Computer Techniques at the Institution of Electrical Engineers. The paper was intended to show, by describing three relatively simple applications, that the digital computer could be a useful aid to the electrical design engineer. The three example problems were:

The Ferranti Mark 1 computer at the University of Manchester was used for the calculations in the three problems. Dent was allowed to use the University's library of subroutines, from which the following were taken and incorporated into the programs:

 Exponential.
 Sine and cosine.
 Square root.
 Solution of simultaneous equations.
 Inversion of matrices.
 Integration of differential equations by Runge–Kutta methods.

The first problem of calculating the impulse voltage distribution on transformer windings took about five hours of machine time. Conversely, a hand calculation, using a method described by Thomas John Lewis in "" (1954), took around three months. The use of a computer in the second problem allowed for a more accurate solution as it was possible to include nonlinear magnetic characteristics in the calculation. In the last problem, the torque and speed curves for the synchronous motors were calculated in around fifteen minutes. Their paper was one of the first to recognise that high speed digital computers could provide considerable assistance to the electrical design engineer by carrying out automatically the optimum design of products.

Significant research had been devoted to determining a transformer's internal transient voltage distribution. Early attempts were hampered by computational limitations encountered when solving large numbers of coupled differential equations with analogue computers. It was not until Dent, with Hartill and Miles, in "" (1958), recognised the limitations of the analogue models and developed a digital computer model, and associated program, where nonuniformity in the transformer windings could be introduced and any input voltage applied.

Publications

Selected papers and academic articles

Publications detail

Dent

Birtwistle

Fleming

Hartill and Miles

Lennard‑Jones

Lennard‑Jones and Chapman

Paton

As contributing mathematician and programmer

See also

Footnotes

References

Bibliography

Further reading
 
  A digital edition, digitised by Jim Lawton in 2008, is available at the Sydney Electric Train Society (SETS) website.

External links
 Beryl Dent's archive held in the Special Collections of the University of Bristol Arts and Social Sciences Library, in Tyndall Avenue, Bristol.
 Photograph of the staff working in the research department of MetropolitanVickers in 1954 in the collections of the Science and Industry Museum. Dent (front, fifth left) is one of only two women in the department. Arthur Fleming is also pictured (front, centre).
 The Manchester transistor computer at the Computer History Museum.
 .

1900 births
1977 deaths
20th-century British physicists
20th-century British women scientists
20th-century English mathematicians
20th-century English women
20th-century English people
20th-century women engineers
Academics of the University of Bristol
Alumni of Newnham College, Cambridge
Alumni of the University of Bristol
British mathematicians
British women computer scientists
British women engineers
British women librarians
British women mathematicians
Computational chemists
English Anglicans
English librarians
English physicists
English women physicists
Mathematical physicists
Metropolitan-Vickers people
People from Clifton, Bristol
People from Sompting
People from Stretford
People from Warminster
Theoretical physicists
Women's Engineering Society
Women mathematicians